Iván Gonzalo Vásquez Quilodrán (born 13 August 1985) is a Chilean professional footballer who plays for Magallanes as a midfielder.

Club career
Born in Lautaro, Cautín Province, Vásquez joined Club Deportivo Universidad Católica's youth system in 2000 at the age of 15. He made his Chilean Primera División debuts three years later, and was part of the squads that won the 2005 Clausura and finished in second position at the 2007 Apertura; in 2006, he was loaned to fellow league club Cobreloa.

In 2009, Vásquez joined O'Higgins FC. He scored his first competitive goal for his new team on 21 November 2010, playing the full 90 minutes in a 1–1 away draw against Unión Española.

Vásquez moved to Audax Italiano on a three-year contract on 10 July 2011, going on to be a midfield mainstay in the following seasons.

International career
Vásquez represented Chile at the 2005 FIFA World Youth Championship in the Netherlands, playing all the games in an eventual round-of-16 exit.

Personal life
Vásquez Quilodrán is of Mapuche descent.

Honours

Club
Universidad Católica
 Primera División de Chile: 2005 Clausura

References

External links
 Audax official profile 
 

1985 births
Living people
Chilean people of Mapuche descent
People from Lautaro
Chilean footballers
Chile under-20 international footballers
Chilean Primera División players
Primera B de Chile players
Club Deportivo Universidad Católica footballers
Cobreloa footballers
O'Higgins F.C. footballers
Audax Italiano footballers
Deportes Magallanes footballers
Magallanes footballers
Association football midfielders
Chilean football managers
Mapuche sportspeople
Indigenous sportspeople of the Americas